Ohrady  is a village and municipality in the Dunajská Streda District in the Trnava Region of south-west Slovakia.

History

The village was first recorded in 1138 as Kywrth in 1252 as Kurth and Kyrth which refers to the ancient Hungarian tribe 'Kürt'. Until the end of World War I, it was part of Hungary and fell within the Dunaszerdahely district of Pozsony County. After the Austro-Hungarian army disintegrated in November 1918, Czechoslovak troops occupied the area. After the Treaty of Trianon of 1920, the village became officially part of Czechoslovakia. In November 1938, the First Vienna Award granted the area to Hungary and it was held by Hungary until 1945. After Soviet occupation in 1945, Czechoslovak administration returned and the village became officially part of Czechoslovakia in 1947.

Its original Slovak name was created in 1927 as Kerty, but the village was renamed by the authorities in 1948 to the current official name.

Demography 
In 1910, the village had 903, for the most part, Hungarian inhabitants. At the 2001 Census the recorded population of the village was 1141 while an end-2008 estimate by the Statistical Office had the villages's population as 1181. As of 2001, 95.27% of its population were Hungarians while 4.38% were Slovaks.

Roman Catholicism is the majority religion of the village, its adherents numbering 93.69% of the total population.

Geography
The municipality lies at an elevation of 113 metres and covers an area of 10.776 km².

Notable people 
 Imrich Bugár, discus thrower

References

External links
Local new at www.parameter.sk. 

Villages and municipalities in Dunajská Streda District
Hungarian communities in Slovakia